Sheridan Airport (5I4) is a public use airport located  north of Sheridan, in Hamilton County, Indiana. The airport was founded in June 1947. Construction began on the Sheridan Airport in 1946. Official flight operations and opening in 1948 making 2018 the 70th anniversary of continuous airport operations in Sheridan.

Originally built to satisfy the business transportation needs of Ken Biddle, founder of Biddle Precision Components, a precision machine shop and Sheridan's largest employer, the airport soon grew to support the needs of Northwest Hamilton County.

The current airport office building started life as the base for Mr. Biddle's personal aircraft, a new but modest two-place Alon Ercoupe. In only a few years Sheridan was home to Mr. Biddle's series of new Cessna 310 twins during the 1950's and 60's. The 310 was the top of the business aircraft produced by Cessna in that era.

By the early 1950's aviation had taken off in the United States both as a business tool and recreation. This necessitated the construction of the 12 unit t-hanger which is still in the use today, housing recreational and training aircraft.

By the late 1960's Sheridan Airport was housing a Cessna 421 cabin class twin in a newly constructed hangar capable of accommodating larger business aircraft. This hangar was at one time leased by United Feeds for their Cessna 414, a modern derivative of the 421.

During these years both a flight school and maintenance facility began operation at the airport. The flight schools have come and gone over the years, and once again an active training facility is housed on the field with one aircraft based on the field and a variety of others available by appointment.

The current 3760' x 50' asphalt paved runway was constructed in 1967 and has received constant maintenance and upgrades throughout  the years. This runway was built to complement the two existing grass runways at Sheridan Airport and provide all weather access.

During the early 1970's an additional 14 unit t-hangar was constructed to house the growing mix of business and recreational aircraft seeking to locate at Sheridan.

In 2001 another 12 unit hangar was constructed and filled before completion due to the rising need for hangar space on the North side of Indianapolis area.

References

External links 

Airports in Indiana
Transportation buildings and structures in Hamilton County, Indiana